"California" is a song written, produced, and performed by American singer Lenny Kravitz, released as the second single from his seventh studio album, Baptism (2004), on July 12, 2004. Kravitz plays all the instruments on the song and uses his own handclaps. The song reached number 28 in Italy and charted moderately in several other European countries. It was released in the United States as a radio single and maxi-single but did not appear on any Billboard charts.

Track listings
US maxi-CD single
 "California"
 "Mr. Cab Driver" (acoustic)

UK 7-inch orange vinyl
 "California"
 "Mr. Cab Driver" (live from Sessions@AOL)

UK CD single
 "California" – 2:37
 "Where Are We Runnin'?" (live at WXRK, New York City) – 3:40

European and Australasian maxi-CD single
 "California" – 2:37
 "Mr. Cab Driver" (live from Sessions@AOL) – 4:00
 "Where Are We Runnin'?" (live at WXRK, New York City) – 3:40

Charts

Release history

References

2004 singles
Lenny Kravitz songs
Song recordings produced by Lenny Kravitz
Songs about California
Songs written by Lenny Kravitz
Virgin Records singles